Shelly School, also known as "The Little Red Schoolhouse," is an historic one-room school located at Richland Township, Bucks County, Pennsylvania. It was built in 1885, and is a one-story, one-room, brick schoolhouse building.  It measures 28 feet wide and 34 feet deep and has a slate-covered gable roof.  The front entrance is covered by a slate-covered shed roof.  The school closed in 1956, and the building re-opened as a local history museum starting in 1959.

It was added to the National Register of Historic Places in 2007.

References

One-room schoolhouses in Pennsylvania
History museums in Pennsylvania
School buildings on the National Register of Historic Places in Pennsylvania
School buildings completed in 1885
Schools in Bucks County, Pennsylvania
National Register of Historic Places in Bucks County, Pennsylvania